Milwaukee Home and Fine Living was a glossy full-color magazine. It was launched in 2004. During the initial years it was published on a bimonthly basis. Journal Communications, Inc. acquired the magazine from Trails Media Group in February 2007 and switched its frequency to monthly.

Articles cover local residential design trends, with a focus on local professional talent in the industry. The magazine claimed circulation of 19,500 copies distributed in Southeastern Wisconsin. The editor was Robert Bundy. The magazine was closed in 2010.

In 2004 the magazine won two major national FOLIO awards: a gold Eddie for editorial Regional Shelter coverage, and a silver Ozzie for Best Design of a New Magazine.

Milwaukee Home and Fine Living reported on philosophies and trends that are driving the residential design movements in Greater Milwaukee. This might have included a home that exemplifies a particular decorating or architectural style, or a profile of a local shop owner, artisan or designer. To be considered, all products, homes, gardens, experts and artisans, etc., featured in the magazine must have had a local connection or be available locally.

Milwaukee Home and Fine Living published a free monthly e-newsletter, featuring a sneak peek of the upcoming issue, editors' picks of local home and fine living events, recipes from some of the area's restaurants, and performing arts previews.

References

External links
Milwaukee Home and Fine Living website
 http://www.jsonline.com/newsletters.html

2004 establishments in Wisconsin
2010 disestablishments in Wisconsin
Bimonthly magazines published in the United States
Lifestyle magazines published in the United States
Monthly magazines published in the United States
Local interest magazines published in the United States
Defunct magazines published in the United States
Design magazines
Magazines established in 2004
Magazines disestablished in 2010
Magazines published in Wisconsin
Mass media in Milwaukee